"When We Make Love" is a song written by Troy Seals and Mentor Williams, and recorded by American country music band Alabama.  The song — a love ballad — was released in April 1984 as the second single from the band's album Roll On, and was the group's 13th straight No. 1 single on the Billboard magazine Hot Country Singles chart that June.

Charts

Weekly charts

Year-end charts

References

Morris, Edward, "Alabama," Contemporary Books Inc., Chicago, 1985
Roland, Tom, "The Billboard Book of Number One Country Hits" (Billboard Books, Watson-Guptill Publications, New York, 1991)

1984 singles
Alabama (American band) songs
Songs written by Troy Seals
Songs written by Mentor Williams
Song recordings produced by Harold Shedd
RCA Records singles
1984 songs